Piz Ot (Romansh: "high peak") is a mountain of the Albula Alps, located west of Samedan in the canton of Graubünden. Reaching a height of 3,246 metres above sea level, it is the culminating point of the range lying north of the Pass Suvretta.

The normal route to the summit starts from the heights of St. Moritz and Samedan, on the southern side of the mountain.

References

External links

 Piz Ot on Hikr
 Piz Ot on Summitpost

Mountains of Graubünden
Mountains of the Alps
Alpine three-thousanders
Mountains of Switzerland
St. Moritz